Warriors of Virtue: The Return to Tao (also known as simply Warriors of Virtue 2 or Warriors of Virtue 2: The Return to Tao) is a 2002 Australian fantasy martial arts film directed by Michael Vickerman and starring Kevin Smith, Nathan Phillips, Nina Liu, and Shedrack Anderson III. It is the straight-to-DVD sequel to the 1997 film Warriors of Virtue and was released by Buena Vista Home Entertainment under the Miramax Home Entertainment label

Plot
Despite only a few years having passed in the real world, many decades have passed in Tao, the parallel universe from the first movie. The kangaroos have changed over the years, now appearing little different from normal humans, and a new villain, Dogon, seizes control of Tao from its young queen. Ryan Jeffers and his friend Chucky, now 16-year-old martial arts competitors in Beijing, find themselves unexpectedly transported to Tao where it is shown that they are to become Warriors of Virtue.

Cast
 Nathan Phillips as Ryan Jeffers
 Kevin Smith as Dogon
 Nina Liu as Amythis
 Shedrack Anderson III as Chucky
 Shuntian Guan as Yun
 Bao Cheng Li as Yee
 Jiaolong Sun as Lai
 Wei Wang as Chi / Yasbin
 Ying Liang as Tsun
 Brandon Lin as Quan
 Wang Zhu as Remo
 Fusen Chen as Matu
 Marina as Keo
 Weiguo Wang as Chieftain
 Jeff Carrara as Coach

Production
Crawford Prods. produced the sequel with Lance Thompson of Film Brokers Intl. as co-producer. Dennis Law, Ron Law and Jeremy Law are exec producers on the project. The worldwide rights were picked up by International Film Group. Miramax Films acquired domestic and Canadian rights, excluding French-speaking Canada, to the film from the International Film Group (IFG). The Film was screened at the 2003 American Film Market. Had the film been successful, it would've served as a backdoor pilot for a proposed TV series.

Death of Kevin Tod Smith
The shooting was touched by misfortune when actor Kevin Smith died while visiting a film set in China. On February 6, 2002, while waiting for the car back to his motel, and after completing work on Warriors of Virtue 2, Smith decided to walk around the Central China Television film studio grounds, and climbed a flimsy prop tower in a set of another film, lost his footing and fell face first approximately three stories onto concrete. He was taken to a hospital, then transferred to Beijing. He lapsed into a coma and was on life support for 10 days, until it was ended. He died on February 15, 2002.

References

External links

2002 films
2002 direct-to-video films
2002 fantasy films
2002 martial arts films
Australian fantasy films
Australian sequel films
Direct-to-video sequel films
Martial arts fantasy films
2000s English-language films